Football clubs from La Liga (Spain) have won a record 69 continental and worldwide titles. Real Madrid, the most successful of them, have won the European Cup on 14 separate occasions and claimed 29 trophies in total. Barcelona have won twenty continental and worldwide titles, while Atlético Madrid have claimed eight. Valencia and Sevilla have each won seven trophies to their name. Additionally, Deportivo La Coruña have been regulars in the UEFA Champions League, while Athletic Bilbao, Espanyol, Alavés, Zaragoza and Mallorca have all contested major finals in second-tier competitions and below. Smaller La Liga clubs, like Villarreal, Celta Vigo and Málaga have also found success in Europe, reaching the latter stages of the Champions League and winning the Europa League, as is the case with Villarreal.

During the 2005–06 European season, La Liga became the first league to have its clubs win both the Champions League and UEFA Cup since 1997, as Barcelona won the UEFA Champions League and Sevilla won the UEFA Cup. This feat was repeated four times in five seasons: during the 2013–14 season Real Madrid won their tenth Champions League title and Sevilla won their third Europa League, during the 2014–15 season Barcelona won their fifth Champions League title and Sevilla won their fourth Europa League, during the 2015–16 season Real Madrid won their eleventh Champions League title and Sevilla won their fifth Europa League (becoming the first team to win the title three times in a row), and during the 2017–18 season Real Madrid won their thirteenth Champions League title and Atlético Madrid won their third Europa League.

Real Madrid won the European Cup five times in a row between 1956 and 1960. La Liga clubs also dominated the early Inter-Cities Fairs Cup. Barcelona, Valencia and Zaragoza won this competition six times between 1958 and 1966, resulting in three all-La Liga finals in 1962, 1964 and 1966.

Spain's dominance in Europe since 2000
Since the turn of the century, La Liga clubs have dominated Europe. In 2000, La Liga had three out of the four semi-finalists in the UEFA Champions League with Real Madrid, Valencia and Barcelona; Real Madrid went on to beat fellow La Liga side Valencia in an all-Spanish final, the first Champions League final between two sides from the same country.

In 2001, La Liga had two out of the four semi-finalists in the UEFA Champions League, with Real Madrid and Valencia. Valencia went on to lose the final again, this time to Bayern Munich. Meanwhile, in the UEFA Cup, La Liga had two out of the four semi-finalists, with Barcelona and Alavés, with Liverpool defeating both sides in the semi-finals and final, respectively.

In 2002, La Liga had two out of the four semi-finalists in the UEFA Champions League with Real Madrid beating Barcelona in the semi-finals, then defeating Bayer Leverkusen in the final for a record ninth title.

In 2003, Real Madrid reached the semi-finals again but this time lost against Juventus. Barcelona and Valencia had been eliminated in the quarter-finals, both by Italian opposition.

In 2004, Deportivo La Coruña reached the semi-finals, knocking out defending champions Milan in the quarter-finals, but lost to eventual winners Porto. In the UEFA Cup, La Liga had two out of the four semi-finalists. Valencia beat Villarreal in the semi-finals before defeating Marseille in the final to win their first UEFA Cup title.

In 2006, La Liga had two out of the four semi-finalists in the UEFA Champions League once again with Barcelona and Villarreal; Barcelona went on to become European champions for a second time by beating Arsenal 2–1 in the final. Meanwhile, in the UEFA Cup, Sevilla followed in Barcelona's footsteps by beating a Premier League side in a European final when they defeated Middlesbrough 4–0. With Barcelona and Sevilla, La Liga took home both European trophies on offer in 2006. Sevilla went on to beat Barcelona 3–0 in the all-Spanish 2006 UEFA Super Cup.

2007 was another successful year for La Liga; in the UEFA Cup they had three out of the four semi-finalists with Sevilla, Espanyol and Osasuna. Sevilla beat Osasuna 2–1 on aggregate, while Espanyol beat German side Werder Bremen 5–1 on aggregate, to set up an all-Spanish UEFA Cup final. In a pulsating match, Adriano gave Sevilla the lead only for Albert Riera to equalise for Espanyol; in the second half Espanyol went down to 10 men, giving Sevilla an extra incentive to take the lead, which they did in extra time through Frédéric Kanouté. But a dramatic late equaliser in the second period of extra time from Espanyol's Jonatas took the match to penalties, which Sevilla won for their second UEFA Cup title. In their second consecutive UEFA Super Cup appearance, Sevilla went on to lose 3–1 to Milan.

In 2009, Barcelona won the Champions League for a third time, defeating Manchester United in the final 2–0 as part of a first-ever Spanish treble and later a sextuple, becoming the first European side to win six trophies in a calendar year. Among these titles were the UEFA Super Cup which they won 1–0 over Shakhtar Donestk, and the FIFA Club World Cup which they won 2–1 against Estudiantes.

In 2010, Atlético Madrid would win the first edition of the newly named UEFA Europa League, overcoming fellow La Liga side Valencia in the quarter-finals, Liverpool in the semi-finals, and defeating Fulham in the final 2–1 after extra time. This was their first European trophy in 48 years. This was followed up by a 2–0 victory over European champions Inter Milan in the 2010 UEFA Super Cup.

In 2011, Barcelona won their fourth Champions League title, two years after the third. They defeated rivals Real Madrid 3–1 on aggregate in an El Clásico semi-final, before once again defeating Manchester United in the final, by a score of 3–1. As in 2009, Barcelona then went on to lift both the UEFA Super Cup and Club World Cup, winning against Porto and Santos, respectfully. That same season, Villarreal reached the semi-finals of the Europa League, beating Napoli, Bayer Leverkusen, and Twente, before being eliminated by eventual winners Porto.

Atlético Madrid won the Europa League for a second time in 2012, following a 3–0 victory in an all-Spanish final against Athletic Bilbao. Atlético reached the final after beating Italian clubs Udinese and Lazio, and overcoming Valencia once again in the semi-finals, who had previously beaten Dutch clubs PSV Eindhoven and AZ. Athletic Bilbao had reached the final by eliminating Manchester United 5–3 in the round of 16 on aggregate, as well as Schalke 04 and Sporting CP in the quarter and semi-finals, respectively. Atlético went on to win a second UEFA Super Cup, after defeating Chelsea 4–1.

In the 2013–14 season, other than Real Sociedad who were eliminated from the Champions League in the group stage, all Spanish clubs in both the Champions League and the Europa League were only eliminated by fellow Spanish clubs. In the Champions League, Barcelona were eliminated by Atlético Madrid in the quarter-final stage with a 1–2 aggregate loss. Atlético went on to eliminate Chelsea in the semi-finals before losing in the final against Real Madrid. Real had reached the final by eliminating three German clubs in succession (Schalke 04, Borussia Dortmund and defending champions Bayern Munich). In the Europa League round of 16, Sevilla and Real Betis were paired for a European version of the Derbi Sevillano, which was won by Sevilla on penalties. After eliminating Porto, Sevilla faced Valencia in the semi-final, winning the first leg 2–0 while losing the return leg 1–3, advancing on away goals thanks to a 94th-minute header by Stéphane Mbia. Sevilla would go on to defeat Benfica on penalties in the final, winning a third UEFA Cup title. In the all-Spanish UEFA Super Cup, Real Madrid defeated Sevilla 2–0.

The nigh excellent performances of Spanish clubs in European competitions continued into the 2014–15 season. The Spanish UEFA coefficient ranking also continued to comfortably lead the rest of the European leagues by a considerable margin. Both major UEFA finals had Spanish teams participating once again as Barcelona and Sevilla made it into the Champions League and Europa League finals respectively. Barcelona would defeat Italian champions Juventus in the final 3–1, becoming the first European side to win two trebles, while Sevilla overcame Dnipro 3–2 for their second consecutive Europa League title. In the 2015 UEFA Super Cup, Barcelona emerged victorious against Sevilla, winning 5–4 in extra time. They also won a then-record third Club World Cup, after a 3–0 win over River Plate.

Both major UEFA competitions would once again be won by La Liga sides in the 2015–16 season as Spanish clubs continued to dominate. Sevilla were again the Europa League winners, completing a historic hat-trick of Europa League titles on the bounce, while at the same time further cementing their position as the most successful European club in that particular competition, with five victories in total. They beat English club Liverpool in the final 3–1. The English side had previously eliminated Villarreal in the semi-finals. Moreover, the Champions League was even more dominated by Spanish clubs. Atlético Madrid, after eliminating fellow Spanish club and defending European champions Barcelona 3–2 on aggregate in the quarter-finals, caused a further upset by eliminating Bavarian giants Bayern Munich in the semi-finals. On 28 May, they faced city rivals Real Madrid for the second time in a Champions League final in three years. The game finished 1–1, and Real Madrid won their eleventh Champions League title after emerging on top after a penalty shoot-out.

The 2016–17 season saw Real Madrid become the first side in the Champions League era to defend their title. After a 3–2 extra time victory over Sevilla in the 2016 UEFA Super Cup, Real eliminated Napoli, Bayern Munich and fellow Spanish semi-finalists Atlético Madrid in the Champions League knockout stage, before defeating Juventus 4–1 in the final. Although no Spanish side reached the final of the Europa League that season, Celta Vigo managed to make the semi-finals, where they were narrowly eliminated 2–1 on aggregate by eventual winners Manchester United.

Cups and finals

Official competitions

European competitions

European Cup / UEFA Champions League

UEFA Cup / UEFA Europa League

European Cup Winners' Cup / UEFA Cup Winners' Cup

European Super Cup / UEFA Super Cup

UEFA Intertoto Cup

Inter-Cities Fairs Cup

Worldwide competitions

Intercontinental Cup

FIFA Club World Cup

Non-UEFA/FIFA competitions

Latin Cup

Spanish teams in European finals

UEFA Champions League (formerly known as European Champion Clubs' Cup or European Cup)

a.e.t. = after extra time

UEFA Cup Winners' Cup (formerly known as European Cup Winners' Cup) (Defunct)

a.e.t. – after extra time

UEFA Europa League (formerly known as UEFA Cup)

a.e.t. – after extra time

UEFA Super Cup (formerly known as European Super Cup)

CL – Winner of European Cup/UEFA Champions League
CWC – Winner of UEFA Cup Winners' Cup
EL – Winner of UEFA Cup/Europa League
a.e.t. – after extra time

UEFA Intertoto Cup (formerly known as International Football Cup, non-UEFA until 1995) (Defunct)

a. There were no Intertoto Cup winners; instead there were eight Group Stage winners.
b. Three teams won the Intertoto Cup and qualified for the UEFA Cup.
c. Eleven teams won their finals and qualified for the UEFA Cup. However, only the team that advanced the furthest in the UEFA Cup were declared Intertoto Cup winners. As a result, the Spanish clubs are not recognized as winners for 2007 and 2008.

Inter-Cities Fairs Cup (Defunct)

a.e.t. – after extra time

Latin Cup (Defunct)

a.e.t. – after extra time

References

 
European football clubs in international competitions